Richard Eldon Killblane (born April 15, 1955) is an American military historian, author and martial arts instructor. A West Point grad in 1979 and a graduate of the U.S. Army Ranger School. He has served in the U. S. Army and became an Intelligence Analyst in the 1st Special Forces Group, on Okinawa, Japan and was cross-trained onto a team as a demolitions man.  Killblane is a veteran of Central American counter-insurgency and Operation Just Cause.  He served as the Command Historian of the U.S. Army Transportation School at Fort Lee, Virginia for 18 years and traveled extensively in Iraq and Afghanistan to research convoy operations.  He has published numerous articles and books on military history and is considered an authority on military convoy security. In 2003, Killblane co-authored The Filthy Thirteen: The True Story of the Dirty Dozen detailing the life and World War II 101st Airborne Division exploits of Jake McNiece.

Military service

Born in Kansas and raised in Oklahoma, Richard Killblane graduated from Ponca City High School in 1973. He enlisted in the U.S. Army in 1973 and became an Intelligence Analyst in the 1st Special Forces Group on Okinawa, Japan and was cross-trained onto a team as a demolitions man for one mission before his unit was inactivated. He was selected to attend the U. S. Military Academy Preparatory School and then was appointed to West Point in 1975. He is a graduate of the U.S. Army Ranger School.

Killblane was commissioned as an infantry lieutenant in 1979 upon graduation from West Point. He was assigned to the 8th Infantry Division (Mechanized)  in West Germany during the Cold War from 1980 to 1982. However, he soon joined the 7th Special Forces Group where he trained Honduran and three El Salvadoran battalions in counter-insurgency operations. He then served as a war planner on 1st Special Operations Command staff from 1985-1986 where he originated the Army special operations concept for contingency operations in Haiti that would come to fruition in 1994 during Operation Uphold Democracy. As a captain, Killblane was transferred to Fort Ord, California where he commanded a rifle company in the 2nd Battalion, 9th Infantry Regiment (Manchus). After command, he became a 7th Infantry Division war planner for military operations in Panama, both Nimrod Dancer and Just Cause.  After serving 11 years as an officer in the Infantry and Special Forces, Killblane left active duty in 1990, having served at every level from private soldier, to company commander to joint task force.

Historian

He earned his MA in History at the University of San Diego in 1992 with the goal to teach soldiers how to use history. During his freelance years, he met Jake McNeice and began writing The Filthy Thirteen. He later became Assistant Command Historian at the U.S. Air Force Technical Applications Command in 1999, and in 2000, he accepted the position of Command Historian for the US Army Transportation Corps

While serving as command historian, Killblane traveled five times to Kuwait and Iraq, twice to Afghanistan, and finally to Haiti during the earthquake response.   He was one of less than a dozen federal historians to deploy to the war zones in Iraq and Afghanistan. He subsequently wrote historical publications on those wars.  His research into convoy operations during Operation Iraqi Freedom and Operation Enduring Freedom incorporated his firsthand experience riding with convoys in Iraq and Afghanistan.  This first hand experience and his research on Vietnam War convoys, have made him the leading authority on gun trucks and convoy security. He authored four books on the subject. He also wrote a study that transformed the last remaining railroad operating battalion into the expeditionary railway center with an advisory capability, and authored the white paper that defined its capability. He finally retired from the Department of the Army in 2019 and Delivering Victory was the culmination of 18 years of research as the Army Transportation Corps Historian.

Martial Arts

Killblane began his martial arts training with boxing and wrestling while in high school and then studied Taekwondo and Hapkido under Son Duk-sung and Sang Soo "Tiger" Kim at West Point, and later Sil Seo Young. His combatives training in the Army taught him some judo and jujitsu. He began training in aikido under Doug Hanson, a senior student of Hiroshi Ikeda and Mitsugi Saotome, in 1996. He then studied under Pat Crosby, a senior student of Akira Tohei, in 2003. When Crosby moved away in 2011, Killblane became the head instructor of Virginia Aikikai and continued his training under Jim Baker, a student of Yoshimitsu Yamada and Hal Lehrman.  In 2019, Killblane began studying how aikido would work against boxing and then Muay Thai in response to a YouTube challenge by Rokas Leonivicious to prove that aikido would work against other martial arts.

References

Bibliography

The Filthy Thirteen, Richard E. Killblane and Jake McNiece, Casemate. 2003
Mentoring and Leading: The Career of Lieutenant General Edward Honor, Richard E. Killblane, US Army Transportation School, 2003
Circle the Wagons, The History of US Army Convoy Security, Global War on Terrorism Occasional Paper Number 13, Richard E. Killblane, Combat Studies Institute, 2005
Convoy Ambush Case Studies, MilitaryBookshop.com.UK, 2010
War Paint; The Filthy Thirteen Jump Into Normandy, Richard E. Killblane and Brian Miller, Victory Press, 2013
Convoy Ambush Case Studies Vol. I, Korea and Vietnam, Richard E. Killblane, US Army Transportation School, 2014
Convoy Ambush Case Studies Vol. II, Iraq and Afghanistan Richard E. Killblane, US Army Transportation School, 2015
Lam Son 719; The Cargo Must Get Through, Richard E. Killblane, US Army Transportation School, 2017
Delivering Victory; The History of U.S. Military Transportation, Richard E. Killblane, Emerald Publishing Limited, 2019.
They Were the Rough Riders; Inside Theodore Roosevelt's Famed Cavalry Regiment, Richard E. Killblane, McFarland, 2022

External links

Video: Two Department of Army Historians Visit 3SCE

Video: Voices of Freedom Project Veterans Oral History of Richard Killblane

Video: How to Make Your Bunk

Video: Aikido v Boxing

Video: Aikido v Boxing 2

Video: Aikido v Muay Thai

Video: Aikido v Boxing 3 Blending

1955 births
Living people
People from Kansas
Ponca City High School alumni
Military personnel from Oklahoma
United States Army soldiers
United States Military Academy alumni
United States Army officers
United States Army Rangers
University of San Diego alumni
American military historians
American male non-fiction writers